Wiesław Jaguś  (born 13 September 1975) is a former Polish speedway rider.

Career
In August 2006, during the Speedway Grand Prix Qualification he won the GP Challenge, which ensured that he claimed a permanent slot for the 2007 Grand Prix. He duly rode in the 2007 Speedway Grand Prix series.

He won the European Pairs Champion in 2007. Jaguś retired from competitive speedway at the close of the 2010 season, after starting his career in 1992. Nominated to "2008 Toruń Citizen of the Year" Gazeta Wyborcza.

Family
His brother Marcin was also a speedway rider.

Speedway Grand Prix results

SGP Podium
 Lonigo 2007 - 3rd place

Career summary

Individual World Championship (Speedway Grand Prix)
2004 - 31st place (wild card)
2006 - 17th place (wild card)
2007 -

Individual Under-21 World Championship
1996 - 14th place - 4 points (X,0,1,3,0)

Team World Championship (Speedway World Cup)
2006 - 5th place - 5 points in Semi-Final A (2,1,1,1,-)

European Pairs Championship
2006 - European Champion - 13 points in Final (3,1,3,3,3,0)

European Club Champions' Cup
2002 - Bronze medal - 19 points in Final (4,2,1,8J,3,1)
 2009 -  Toruń - Runner-up (5 pts) Toruń

Individual Polish Championship
1998 - Bronze medal
1999 - 15th place
2001 - 7th place
2003 - 4th place
2004 - 14th place
2006 - Silver medal
2007 - 13th place

Individual Under-21 Polish Championship
1994 - 10th place
1996 - 14th place

Polish Pairs Speedway Championship
2003 - Bronze medal
2004 - Polish Champion
2005 - 5th place

Polish Under-21 Pairs Championship
1994 - Bronze medal
1995 - Bronze medal
1996 - 6th place

Team Polish Championship
1992 - Bronze medal
1993 - Bronze medal
1994 - Bronze medal
1995 - Silver medal
1996 - Silver medal
2001 - Polish Champion
2003 - Silver medal
2007 - Silver medal
2008 - Polish Champion
2009 - Silver medal

Polish Under-21 Team Championship
1993 - Silver medal
1994 - Bronze medal

Team Polish Cup
1993 - Gold medal
1996 - Gold medal
1998 - Gold medal
1999 - Silver medal

Golden Helmet
1999 - 13th place
2002 - 8th place
2003 - 4th place
2004 - Gold medal
2006 - 4th place

Golden Silver (Under-21)
1994 - 14th place
1995 - 7th place
1996 - Gold medal

See also
List of Speedway Grand Prix riders
Poland national speedway team

References

External links

(pl) Official website
(en) Wiesław Jaguś Facebook Page 
(pl) Unibax Toruń - rider profile
(sv) Smederna Eskilstuna - rider profile

1975 births
Living people
Polish speedway riders
European Pairs Speedway Champions
Sportspeople from Toruń